Cove School is a public charter school in Cove, Oregon, United States.

Academics

In 2008, 93% of the school's seniors received their high school diploma. Of 15 students, 14 graduated and 1 dropped out.

References

High schools in Union County, Oregon
Education in Union County, Oregon
Public middle schools in Oregon
Public elementary schools in Oregon
Charter schools in Oregon
Public high schools in Oregon